Roman Popov (born May 3, 1980) is a Russian former professional ice hockey defenceman.

Popov played in the Russian Superleague and Kontinental Hockey League for HC CSK VVS Samara, HC Sibir Novosibirsk, HC MVD and Metallurg Novokuznetsk

References

External links

1980 births
Living people
Avtomobilist Yekaterinburg players
Barys Nur-Sultan players
HC CSK VVS Samara players
Kazakhmys Satpaev players
Metallurg Novokuznetsk players
HC MVD players
People from Angarsk
Rubin Tyumen players
Russian ice hockey defencemen
HC Sibir Novosibirsk players
Yermak Angarsk players
Sportspeople from Irkutsk Oblast